Cordeiro is a municipality located in the Brazilian state of Rio de Janeiro. Its population was 22,041 (2020) and its area is 116 km².

Cordeiro (lamb in Portuguese) is a municipality located in the Brazilian state of Rio de Janeiro. Its population was 19,764 (2005) and its area is 116 km².[1] This city has many beautiful monuments, prominence for the Methodist church, the park of exhibitions and the Cordeiro Social Club.

References

Municipalities in Rio de Janeiro (state)